Ivan Charles Messmer (July 23, 1931 – March 8, 2015) was a Canadian politician, who represented the riding of Boundary-Similkameen in the Legislative Assembly of British Columbia from 1986 to 1991 as a member of the Social Credit Party. He held several roles in the Executive Council of British Columbia during his term as an MLA, including Minister of Parks and Solicitor General of British Columbia.

He served alongside Jim Hewitt, and later Bill Barlee, in a multiple-member district. Following riding redistribution for the 1991 general election, Messmer ran in the new district of Okanagan-Penticton, but was defeated by Jim Beattie.

Prior to entering provincial politics, Messmer served six years as mayor of Penticton. He died on March 8, 2015.

References

1931 births
2015 deaths
British Columbia municipal councillors
British Columbia Social Credit Party MLAs
Canadian construction businesspeople
Mayors of Penticton
Members of the Executive Council of British Columbia
People from Barrhead, Alberta
20th-century Canadian politicians
Solicitors general of Canadian provinces